Nicole Ehizele Enabosi (born 26 March 1997) in Gaithersburg (Maryland) is a Nigerian-American Basketball player, she plays for the Slovak side MBK Ružomberok and the Nigerian national team.

High school
Enabosi attended Our Lady of Good Counsel High School (Montgomery County, Maryland)

College career
Enabosi started playing for the Delaware Fightin' Blue Hens in 2015–16 season, she averaged 8.9 PPG and 7.1 RPG in her freshman year. In her sophomore year, she averaged 13.7 PPG and 10.0 RPG. In her 3rd year, she averaged 18.0PPG and 11.8 RPG. She was named the Colonial Athletic Association (CAA) player of the year for the 2017–18 season.

Enabosi missed the 2018–19 season due to injury, she tore her anterior cruciate ligament(ACL) and hurt her knee during the try outs with the Nigerian Women's basketball team preparations for the 2018 FIBA Women's World cup in Spain.

Enabosi resumed playing for Delaware in the 2019–20 season as a graduate Student, she was named in the CAA 2019 preseason All conference team and  she has been named the CCA player of the week twice.

Delaware statistics

Source

Professional career
Nicole declared for the 2020 WNBA Draft but went undrafted. In 2020, She joined the Slovak team MBK Ružomberok and help the team the retain the 2021 Slovak Women's Basketball Extraliga. She averaged 16 points, 7.5 rebounds and 1.6 assists in her first season at the club.

References

1997 births
Living people
Basketball players from New Jersey
Delaware Fightin' Blue Hens women's basketball players
Nigerian women's basketball players
Power forwards (basketball)
AfroBasket 2021
American women's basketball players
Citizens of Nigeria through descent
African-American basketball players
Nigerian people of African-American descent
American emigrants to Nigeria
American sportspeople of Nigerian descent
21st-century African-American sportspeople